The 1896–97 Yale Bulldogs men's ice hockey season was the 2nd season of play for the program.

Season
Though the team had lost its founder and driving force to graduation (Malcolm Greene Chace), Yale continued to support it's men's hockey team. The second season saw a series of firsts for the program, including its first home game, its first game against an eventual Ivy League member and its first losing season. The team did not have a coach, however, John Hall served as team manager.

Most of Yale's games were played against amateur athletic clubs but all games were counted for the Bulldogs' record.

Roster

Standings

Schedule and Results

|-
!colspan=12 style="color:white; background:#00356B" | Regular Season

References

Yale Bulldogs men's ice hockey seasons
Yale
Yale
Yale
Yale